The Indian Priest is a 2016 Swedish-Indian documentary film about a Carmelites of Mary Immaculate (C.M.I.) Catholic priest from south India, Father Raphael Kurian, who is sent to modern and secular Sweden as a missionary on the request from the evergrowing Catholic Church in Sweden and bishop Anders Arborelius.

The documentary mainly focuses on Father Raphael Kurian's daily life, work and life in priestly celibacy at the parishes in Falun and Olofström, Sweden as well as in the Syro-Malabar Church monastery congregation outside Thrissur at Elthuruth in Kerala, India.

The film is produced by Freedom From Choice AB and Film i Dalarna, and directed by award-winning Swedish film director Mattias Löw.

The documentary has received international attention with awards at WorldFest Houston International Film Festival and Los Angeles Film Review (LAFR) Independent Film Awards in United States, nominations and official selections at film festivals including Riverside International Film Festival (RIFF) in United States and Ethnografilm at Claude Lelouche's Ciné 13 Théâtre in Paris, France.

References

External links 
 
 

2016 films
2016 documentary films
Swedish documentary films
2010s Swedish-language films
2010s Malayalam-language films
Films about Catholicism
Films about clerical celibacy
Documentary films about Christianity
Films directed by Tomas Mattias Löw
2010s English-language films
Indian documentary films
2010s Swedish films